GNOME 3 is the third major release of the GNOME desktop environment. A major departure from technologies implemented by its predecessors, GNOME 3 introduced a dramatically different user interface. It was the first GNOME release to utilize a unified graphical shell known as GNOME Shell. It also introduced support for the Wayland display protocol and added integration with other key technologies such as Flatpak during its development lifecycle.

While loose planning began as early as 2004, it was not officially announced until 2008, and received an initial release in 2011. It was superseded by GNOME 40 in 2021.

Features
Much of GNOME 3's user interface changes were based-on attempts at simplification and rethinking of traditional desktop computing workflows. Eschewing the beige colors present in GNOME 2 in favor of a modern black and gray, a new look and feel was implemented, which became known as Adwaita.

Possibly the single-most significant feature change that GNOME 3 introduced was the replacement of the GNOME Panel with the larger-scoped GNOME Shell. With it, came the removal of the desktop metaphor as seen in previous versions in favor of a simple image-based background that distinctly lacks desktop icons. Dropping the Metacity window manager in favor of Mutter, users saw window titlebar decorations do away with maximize and minimize icon buttons.

With the release of GNOME 3.2, shell extensions as a feature, similar to the "applet" of GNOME 2, was added. Such extensions allow developers the ability to add modular, separately-versioned customizations to the desktop environment, without having to integrate code directly into the mainline GNOME codebase.

On September 25, 2013, GNOME 3.10 was released, which introduced support for the Wayland display protocol, as the Mutter window manager added experimental compositing. As the most-used graphical environment for Linux, this set-up a significant change for distributions to eventually be able to switch from the aging X Window System as a default.

GNOME Core Applications took on a unified naming scheme, by utilizing simple, descriptive names such as "Files" instead of "Nautilus" or "Videos" instead of "Totem". Added to the set of core applications in version 3.10 was GNOME Software, which in concert with AppStream metadata, and the PackageKit daemon, serves as a complete app store and system update utility. GNOME 3.18 added integration with the Linux Vendor Firmware Service for hardware vendors to provide firmware updates directly through GNOME Software. GNOME 3.22 integrated GNOME Software with Flatpak. GConf, the system used for storing configuration-related settings in the desktop and applications, was deprecated in GNOME 3, and replaced by GSettings and dconf.

Development
By late 2004, two years into the release of GNOME 2, discussion of the next major release had started occurring. A wiki was posted on the GNOME website that detailed loose brainstorming of compatibility-breaking ideas from project co-founder Federico Mena and several other GNOME contributors.

The community developed the nickname "Project Topaz" for the development effort, as a reference to an acronym of the version phrase "three point zero".

A greater public-facing GNOME 3 discussion began in late May 2005 when Canonical engineer and former GNOME Foundation board director, Jeff Waugh gave a presentation at the sixth annual GUADEC, regarding "Project Topaz". In this presentation, Waugh demonstrated mockups that had been compiled from numerous community ideas, and a brainstorming session occurred thereafter.

Having previously focused on steady incremental growth throughout the desktop environment's development, showcasing dramatic and innovative workflows not currently used in the desktop environment was a controversial subject. In late 2006, GNOME released an official statement that there were no plans for GNOME 3.

In June 2008, Andy Wingo, a GNOME contributor, published an influential article on his personal blog, decrying a stagnating direction of GNOME.

GNOME 3 was officially announced at the 2008 edition of GUADEC.

From October 6-10, 2008, GNOME held a hackathon focused on user experience in Boston. Vincent Untz, part of the release team, noted that designers and developers "tried to forget the current GNOME and see what [they] thought would make sense." As a result of the event, initial mockups were created, and Red Hat agreed to contribute development to the effort.

GNOME 3 pre-releases used a 2.91.x versioning scheme. The first beta version of GNOME 3 was debuted on February 23, 2011.

Having shipped GNOME as its default graphical environment on Ubuntu since its debut, Canonical initially collaborated on development, but eventually became disillusioned, and halted their efforts. This became the catalyst for development of their Unity shell to be used in place of the standard GNOME Shell. Canonical eventually began using a customized version of the GNOME Shell in 2017, when it released Ubuntu 17.10.

Originally scheduled to be released in March 2010, GNOME's release team delayed version 3.0 several times before finally releasing it on April 6, 2011.

Reception
GNOME 3 had a very mixed reception. Its succession as the ongoing focus of The GNOME Project was the impetus for the fork of GNOME 2 known as the MATE desktop environment as well as the creation of the Cinnamon desktop environment, which follows more traditional desktop metaphor conventions. The first adoption of GNOME 3 in a major Linux distribution was version 15 of Fedora Linux. Canonical, who had stopped contributing to the GNOME 3 codebase, chose to break from bundling a GNOME Shell for Ubuntu, and instead released its Unity shell. Canonical eventually began using a customized version of the GNOME Shell in 2017, when it released Ubuntu 17.10. openSUSE included it in version 12.1.

Scott Gilbertson of The Register noted that GNOME 3 represented "shocking changes", but was "cleaner" and "simpler". Ars Technica called the new GNOME Shell a "good starting point for building something even better", and predicted "backlash from users" who would be upset about missing features. Steven Vaughan-Nichols of ZDNet said that it "made GNOME less usable", and that it was a "step backward". However, he later expressed that GNOME 3.4 was a "return to a useful Linux desktop". Lifehacker's Whitson Gordon preferred the stock GNOME 3 desktop environment over Canonical's Unity and other alternatives.

Linus Torvalds, creator of the Linux kernel, publicly expressed his dislike of GNOME 3, and called the version 3.4 release a "total user experience design failure." He also described it as "one step forward, one step back". Torvalds initially switched from using GNOME to Xfce, but then switched back in 2013, citing the use of GNOME Shell Extensions as a fix for shortcomings, and called it "more pleasant".

References

3
Free desktop environments
2011 software